Col de Sarenne is a mountain pass located in the Grandes Rousses massif,  approximately  east of Alpe d'Huez in the Isère department of France. The pass connects Alpe d'Huez with the villages of Mizoën and Le Freney-d'Oisans in the Romanche valley. The road over the pass was used on Stage 18 of the 2013 Tour de France bicycle race as this loops round to enable the cyclists to climb the Alpe d'Huez twice in the same stage.

Details of the climb

From the south, the road to the pass follows the D25 from its junction with the D1091 to the east of Le Freney-d'Oisans.

The passage over the summit was used in the 2013 Tour de France; following that race, German rider Tony Martin criticized the decision of the Tour de France organisers to use the pass, saying: "The road is old and narrow. It’s a bad road, no guardrails. A mistake could see you falling straight down 30 metres. It's irresponsible to send us there." Martin repeated his criticisms on the eve of the Tour de France: It’s still the same descent. … It’s quite nasty and a really dangerous descent. We’ve made a lot of comments already in the media, so I really hope the organization heard it.

In the race, the summit was crossed first by a group of four riders, led by Tejay van Garderen. On the descent, van Garderen had a technical problem with his bike, and Christophe Riblon left the road on a corner before going on to win the stage at the top of Alpe d'Huez.

References

External links

Le col de Sarenne dans le Tour de France 
Cycle the Col de Sarenne (www.morethan21bends.com)
Cycling up to the Col de Sarenne: data, profile, map, photos and description

Mountain passes of Auvergne-Rhône-Alpes
Mountain passes of the Alps
Landforms of Isère